Frederick Eley may refer to:
Sir Frederick Eley, 1st Baronet (1866–1951), English banker
Frederick Eley (architect) (1884–1979), American architect